In mathematics, Heegner's lemma is a lemma used by Kurt Heegner in his paper on the class number problem. His lemma states that if
 

is a curve over a field with a4 not a square, then it has a solution if it has a solution in an extension of odd degree.

References

Diophantine equations
Lemmas in number theory